Peoria is an unincorporated community in Franklin County, Kansas, United States.

History
Peoria was founded in the late 1850s. it was named for the Peoria tribe, who once owned the town site.

A post office opened in Peoria in 1857, closed in 1859, reopened in 1860, and closed permanently in 1934.

Geography

Climate
Peoria experiences a Cfa climate (Subtropical) climate.

References

Further reading

External links
 Franklin County maps: Current, Historic, KDOT

Unincorporated communities in Franklin County, Kansas
Unincorporated communities in Kansas
1857 establishments in Kansas Territory